Rusanovo is a rural locality in Nagornoye Rural Settlement, Petushinsky District, Vladimir Oblast, Russia. The population was 3 as of 2010.

Geography 
Rusanovo is located 41 km northwest of Petushki (the district's administrative centre) by road. Iroshnikovo is the nearest rural locality.

References 

Rural localities in Petushinsky District